In the mathematical study of several complex variables, the Bergman kernel, named after Stefan Bergman, is the reproducing kernel for the Hilbert space (RKHS) of all square integrable holomorphic functions on a domain D in Cn.

In detail, let L2(D) be the Hilbert space of square integrable functions on D, and let L2,h(D) denote the subspace consisting of holomorphic functions in L2(D): that is,

where H(D) is the space of holomorphic functions in D.  Then L2,h(D) is a Hilbert space: it is a closed linear subspace of L2(D), and therefore complete in its own right.  This follows from the fundamental estimate, that for a holomorphic square-integrable function ƒ in D

for every compact subset K of D.  Thus convergence of a sequence of holomorphic functions in L2(D) implies also compact convergence, and so the limit function is also holomorphic.

is a continuous linear functional on L2,h(D).  By the Riesz representation theorem, this functional can be represented as the inner product with an element of  L2,h(D), which is to say that

The Bergman kernel K is defined by

The kernel K(z,ζ) is holomorphic in z and antiholomorphic in ζ, and satisfies

Since the  inner product on this space is manifestly invariant under biholomorphisms of D, the Bergman kernel and the associated Bergman metric are therefore automatically invariant under the automorphism group of the domain.

See also
 Bergman metric
 Bergman space
 Szegő kernel

References
 .
 .

Several complex variables